Decius was Exarch of Ravenna from October 584 to 585.  He is thought to have been the first exarch of Ravenna, although some believe that Baduarius had been exarch before him.

References 

6th-century exarchs of Ravenna